This is a list of member states of the Commonwealth of Nations by population, which is sorted by the 2015 mid-year normalized demographic projections.

Table

Notes

See also
List of countries by population
List of countries by past and future population

Commonwealth
Commonwealth
Commonwealth of Nations